Cephalopholis leopardus, also known as the Leopard grouper  or Leopard hind , is a species of marine ray-finned fish, a grouper from the subfamily Epinephelinae which is in the family Serranidae which also includes the anthias and sea basses. It is found in the Indo-Pacific.

Description
The Leopard grouper is a small to medium-sized fish which grows up to 24 cm.
The body is fusiform or spindle-shaped and compressed laterally.
The caudal fin is rounded.
The mouth is big and has a superior position.
The body background coloration is light brown, reddish or light green-gray. 
On the top part of the body, blotches form marbling like pattern.
The low part is spotted.
The front snout is covered with small red or dark dots .
The leopard grouper can easily be confused with Cephalopholis urodeta but it differs mainly from this latter by two dark blotches located on the top part of its caudal peduncle.
The caudal fin is distinguished by two red to dark lines forming a "V" and another black line parallel to the top line of the "V".

Distribution & habitat
It is widely distributed throughout the tropical waters of the Indian Ocean, Red Sea, Persian Gulf and South Africa excluded, to the central island of the Pacific Ocean.

Feeding
Cephalopholis leopardus is carnivorous and its diet consists mainly in small fishes and crustaceans, it's an ambush predator.

Behavior
The leopard grouper is solitary, territorial, demersal and has a nocturnal and/or a diurnal activity
which can be maximal at sunrise and/or at sunset.
It is protogynous hermaphrodite, which means the female can change sex to become male during its life.

References

External links
 Bailly, N. (2013). Cephalopholis leopardus (Lacepède, 1801). In: Froese, R. and D. Pauly. Editors. (2013) FishBase. Accessed through: World Register of Marine Species at http://www.marinespecies.org/aphia.php?p=taxdetails&id=218185 on 2013-06-18.
http://eol.org/pages/204625/details
 

leopardus
Fish described in 1801